John Henderson (8 August 1928 – 26 January 2019) was a New Zealand cricketer. He played in three first-class matches for Central Districts in 1960/61.

See also
 List of Central Districts representative cricketers

References

External links
 

1928 births
2019 deaths
New Zealand cricketers
Central Districts cricketers
Cricketers from Hastings, New Zealand